The Willamette Valley AVA is an American Viticultural Area which lies in the Willamette Valley of Oregon.  The AVA is the wine growing region which encompasses the drainage basin of the Willamette River.  It stretches from the Columbia River in the north to just south of Eugene in the south, where the Willamette Valley ends; and from the Oregon Coast Range in the west to the Cascade Mountains in the east.  At , it is the largest AVA in the state, and contains most of the state's wineries; approximately 908 as of 2021.

The boundaries of the Willamette Valley AVA were established in 1984. Since then, ten smaller AVAs (sometimes termed "sub-AVAs" or "sub-appellations") have been created entirely within the Willamette Valley AVA, with nine of them in the northern Willamette Valley and the Lower Long Tom AVA in the south. The Willamette Valley has a cool, moist climate, and is recognized worldwide for its Pinot noir.

Although this distinction is not officially recognized, many wine connoisseurs further divide the Willamette Valley into northern and southern regions, the dividing line being the approximate latitude of Salem (approximately 45° north latitude).

Climate 

The climate of Willamette Valley is mild year-round.  Winters are typically cool and wet, summers are dry and warm;  heat above   only occurs 5 to 15 days per year, and the temperature drops below  once every 25 years.  Most rainfall occurs in the late autumn, winter, and early spring, when temperatures are the coldest.  The valley gets relatively little snow ( to ) per year. The hardiness zone is mostly 8b.

Not all portions of the Willamette Valley are suitable for vineyards, however, and the largest concentration of wineries is found west of the Willamette River, on the leeward slopes of the Coast Range, or among the numerous river and stream valleys created by Willamette River tributaries.  By far, the largest concentration of wineries is in Yamhill County.

Sub-appellations 
There are ten American Viticultural Areas within the Willamette Valley AVA. These smaller AVAs recognize regions within the larger Willamette Valley AVA that have distinctive climate, soil, elevation, or other physical features that make them noteworthy for wine production.

Chehalem Mountains AVA 

The Chehalem Mountains AVA, established in 2006, stretches  from Wilsonville in the southeast to Forest Grove in the northwest.  The Chehalem Mountains includes Ribbon Ridge, Parrett Mountain, and Bald Peak.  The petition process for the creation of the AVA began in 2001 and was led by David Adelsheim of Adelsheim Vineyard.  It contains two sub-regions, Laurelwood District AVA and Ribbon Ridge AVA.

Dundee Hills AVA 

The Dundee Hills AVA in the hills north and west of Dundee. Over 25 wineries and independent vineyards in this region produce over 44,000 cases of wine. The area is particularly noted for its Pinot noir; several wineries in the AVA have won international recognition for their wines.

Eola-Amity Hills AVA 

The Eola-Amity Hills AVA stretches from the town of Amity in the north to Salem in the south. The Eola-Amity Hills area benefits from steady winds off the Pacific Ocean that reach the Willamette Valley through the Van Duzer corridor, a gap in the Oregon Coast Range, moderating the summer temperatures. The name Eola is a tribute to the windy conditions in the area, and is derived from Aeolus, the Greek god of wind.

Laurelwood District AVA 

The Laurelwood District AVA is located west of the city of Portland and lies entirely within the Willamette Valley and Chehalem Mountains AVAs since it was established by the TTB in May 2020. The distinguishing feature of the Laurelwood District is the predominance of the Laurelwood soil series.

Lower Long Tom AVA 

The Lower Long Tom AVA was established in 2021. It is located in the southern Willamette Valley in Lane and Benton Counties, near the towns of Junction City and Monroe. As of 2022, the Lower Long Tom is the only nested appellation located in the southern Willamette Valley AVA, in contrast to nine nested appellations in the north. The region is primarily known for its Pinot noir and Pinot gris.

McMinnville AVA 

The McMinnville AVA near McMinnville was established in 2005, in the hills to the southwest of McMinnville, roughly running from McMinnville to Sheridan.

Ribbon Ridge AVA 

The Ribbon Ridge AVA, between Newberg and Gaston, is a ridge containing uplift of ocean sediment. It lies at 45° 21' N, 123° 04' W, at the northwest end of the Chehalem Mountains. The name originates in the 19th century.

Tualatin Hills AVA 

The distinguishing features of Tualatin Hills are its soils, elevation and climate.

Van Duzer Corridor AVA 

The Van Duzer wind AVA is known low elevations and gently rolling hills,  cool breezes from the Pacific Ocean, and soils which are primarily uplifted marine sedimentary loams and silts with alluvial overlay. The AVA was established in 2019.

Yamhill-Carlton District AVA 

The Yamhill-Carlton District AVA is located in the area surrounding the towns of Yamhill and Carlton. The AVA was established in 2005.

References

American Viticultural Areas
Oregon wine
Willamette Valley
1984 establishments in Oregon